Phytoecia atrohumeralis is a species of beetle in the family Cerambycidae. It was described by Stephan von Breuning in 1964. It is known from the Congo.

References

Phytoecia
Beetles described in 1964